Satya Churn Law (also transcribed as Satya Charan Law or in Bengali Satyacharan Laha) (1888 – 11 December 1984) was a wealthy naturalist, amateur ornithologist, educationist and intellectual in Calcutta. 

Law was born to Ambikacharan Laha and Kiranbala Devi at their home on Kailash Bose Street in Calcutta. He was educated at Metropolitan College, and at Presidency College, obtaining a master's degree in history. He then obtained a law degree. He had an interest in bird from an early age and began to keep them and observe them in captivity. He was for a while a treasurer of the Indian Statistical Institute. He established an aviary at this home in Agarpada, near Calcutta in 1926. He was elected Fellow of the Zoological Society of London and Member of the British Ornithologists' Union. In 1937, Nirad C. Chaudhuri became his literary assistant. He wrote books on a variety of topics including birds (Pet Birds of Bengal 1923) based on his experience in keeping aviaries. He was a vice president of the Calcutta Zoological Garden for a while. He founded, in 1924, a journal, Prakriti, in Bengali for the popularization of natural science.

References

External links
 Aviary at Agarpara to house a business school. The Telegraph, 21 March 2003
 Pet Birds of Bengal
 Kalidaser Pakhi (The Birds of Kalidasa)

Indian naturalists
Scholars from Kolkata
1984 deaths
Year of birth missing
20th-century Indian biologists